Grey Tickles, Black Pressure is the third solo album by American musician John Grant. It was released via Bella Union on October 9, 2015.

Production
The album's title stems from the literal translation of two foreign phrases: "grey tickles" is an Icelandic phrase for approaching middle age, while "black pressure" is the Turkish term for a nightmare. Grant stated that he wanted to get "angrier and moodier" on the album, although he enjoyed the process of making it more than his previous two.

The album's trailer features Grant in the midst of a psychotic break, covered in blood and wielding a croquet mallet as a weapon. He described it as a fantasy of "what [he] would like to do every time somebody calls [him] a faggot". The album features three guests: English singer Tracey Thorn features on the track "Disappointing", American singer Amanda Palmer provides backing vocals on "You & Him", and English drummer Budgie plays the drums on every track. The latter would also go on tour as Grant's drummer.

Reception

The album received acclaim. NME named it "one of the albums of the year" and praised both its personal lyrics and pop melodies. On their own lists of the best albums of the year, The Guardian and Rough Trade respectively placed it at No. 38 and No. 11. Time named the 11th track on the album, "Disappointing", as the fifth best song of 2015.

Accolades

Track listing

Charts

Personnel
Primary musicians

 John Grant – lead vocals, keyboards, synth programming and sequencing
 Pétur Hallgrímsson – guitar
 Jakob Smári Magnússon – bass
 Budgie – drums

Additional musicians

Amanda Palmer - additional vocals (track 5)
Tracey Thorn - additional vocals (track 11)
Fiona Brice - additional vocals, string, brass and vocal arrangements (written and conducted by), violin
Tierannye Sparks - additional vocals
Alisa Alexander - additional vocals
Bobby Sparks - keyboards
John Congleton - synth programming and sequencing, drum programming and sequencing
David Monsch - bass clarinet
Matt Milewski - violin
Natalie Floyd - violin
Sarah Carmichael - violin
Buffi Jacobs - cello
Debbie Brooks - cello
Keith Jourdan - trumpet
Peter Clagett - trumpet
David Pierce - trombone
Carl Murr - trombone
Simon Willats - tuba
Heather Test - french horn
Wes Baggaley - spoken word (track 1)
Olafur Darri Olafsson - spoken word (track 1)
Petra Hallberg - spoken word (track 1)
Jeppe Kjellberg - spoken word (track 1)
Billy Novik - spoken word (track 1)
Karl Neukauf - spoken word (track 1)
Carys Connolly - spoken word (track 14)

References

2015 albums
John Grant (musician) albums
Bella Union albums